Roberto de Macedo (born 15 March 1980) is a Brazilian equestrian. He competed in the individual eventing at the 2000 Summer Olympics.

References

External links
 

1980 births
Living people
Brazilian male equestrians
Olympic equestrians of Brazil
Equestrians at the 2000 Summer Olympics
People from Araraquara
Sportspeople from São Paulo (state)